Greensville may refer to:

Greensville, Ontario, Canada
Greensville County, Virginia
Greensville Correctional Center, a state prison facility in Greensville County, Virginia

See also
Greenville (disambiguation)